Eugenie Keefer Bell (born May 2, 1951) is an American-Australian artist, notable for creating jewellery.

Keefer Bell trained in San Diego and moved to Australia in 1981. She spent five years teaching and working in Tasmania before moving to Perth. Examples of her work, including brooches and jewellery, are in the collections of the Museum of Fine Arts Houston, the National Gallery of Victoria, the Museum of Applied Arts and Sciences and the Smithsonian American Art Museum.

References

External links 
 Craft ACT member profile
 Bilk Gallery artist profile

1951 births
Living people
20th-century American women artists
21st-century American women artists
Artists from San Diego
Artists in the Smithsonian American Art Museum collection
Australian women artists